The Club Olympique des Transports, often referred to as COT or Ennakel is a Tunisian football club based in the city of Tunis. The club was founded in 1945, the team plays in blue and black colors. Their ground is currently the Ali Belhouane Stadium, which has a capacity of 7,000.

The club gold era was the 70s when coach Hmid Dhib had built a strong team around Mohieddine Habita – nicknamed the "Arabic Pele" by the Libyans, on the occasion of the Arab nation's Cup (called Palestine Cup) disputed in Tripoli in August 1973, where Habita scored six goals and was named the "Tunisian Pelé" by President Habib Bourguiba while receiving the victorious Tunisian team. Also Ali Kaabi, Farouk Ben Sliman and Houcine Ayari or the team shaped by Bernard Blaut, who won the Cup in Tunisia in 1988 and lost the championship in special conditions.
In all COT spends 27 seasons in the first division (professional level).

But, like all districts clubs, the club installed in Mellassine, a popular district of Tunis, was unable to resist the deman and has plummeted in three years to end up in the fourth division in 2007–2008 before rising again to CLP-3, and reaching the quarter-finals of the President Cup this year.

It's hard for COT to keep their fans because the crisis and especially because the club is located in the Capital Tunis, where the most popular clubs are Espérance Tunis and Club Africain.

History
It was in July 1945 that the ancestor of the COT, En-Najah Sports was created through a group formed around Mustapha Achour and include the cyclist Jilani Ben Othman and sports director Belhassen Chaar. The club merged with El Hilal Sports du Den-Den (EHSDD) to form the "Club Olympique Tunisien" (Tunisian Olympic Club) in 1960, and then with the "Association sportive des traminots" (Sports Association of traminots) on 29 June 1966, forming Club Olympique des Transports.

Colours and badges
CO Transports supporters help is needed to develop this section.

Honors and achievements

Performance in national and domestic competitions
Tunisian League
Runner-up : 1987–88
Third : 1970–71, 1971–72
Tunisian President Cup
Winner: 1987–88
Tunisian Leagues Cup
Best performance: 1999–2000 Lost in 1/2 final against Club sportive Sfaxien 3–0

Performance in CAF Competitions
CAF Cup Winners' Cup: 1 appearances
1988-89: first round (1/16 final) against Stade Malien.
3-0 in Bamako
0-0 in Tunis

Former personal

Presidents

En-Najah Sports
 Mustapha Achour
 Mongi Allal
 Raouf Ben Ali (1956–1957)
 Mustapha Khaled (1957–1958)

Club Olympique des Transports

Coaches

References

Association football clubs established in 1945
Football clubs in Tunisia
Football clubs in Tunis
1945 establishments in Tunisia
Sports clubs in Tunisia